Radio Otago was a radio company that operated a group of local radio stations in radio markets around New Zealand from the 1970s to the late 1990s. Radio Otago was started in 1971 when Dunedin station 4XO was started, 4XO was originally branded as Radio Otago 4XO.
During the 1980s and 1990s Radio Otago expanded their operations by starting up stations around Otago and the rest of New Zealand, and also by purchasing existing stations.

The company sold its seven North Island stations in 1997 to Energy Enterprises and funds from the sale were used to purchase C93 FM Limited allowing Radio Otago to compete in the Christchurch market. In 1999, Energy Enterprises merged with Radio Pacific to become Pacific/RadioWorks Group. Then, Pacific/RadioWorks merged with Radio Otago, forming RadioWorks.

Radio stations

North Island stations
These stations were sold to Energy Enterprises in 1997.
 Classic Rock 92FM Tauranga
 90.2 Hot FM Rotorua
 93.5 Kis FM Taupo
 96FM Rotorua
 Classic Gold 1548 Rotorua
 Hot 93 Hastings
 92 MORE FM Napier
 Star FM Wanganui

92 MORE FM in Napier was operated as a franchised station, this station became Hawkes Bay's 92FM and later was replaced with network station Solid Gold, Classic Rock 92FM in Tauranga also was replaced with Solid Gold. Classic Gold 1548 in Rotorua was closed down and the station was used as a second frequency for Lakes 96FM, and today is used for TAB Trackside (previously known as BSport, then LiveSport). The other stations Kis FM, Lakes 96FM, Hot 93 and Star FM were all rebranded as More FM in late 2004/early 2005 when RadioWorks rebranded the majority of their heritage stations as More FM. 
90.2 Hot FM Rotorua started as a summer station  before it became 96FM permanently. This summer station recruited local talent as well as bringing in seasoned veterans from the Hawkes Bay. Many went on to have long careers in local and international radio.

South Island stations
Prior to the sale of the company in 1999, Radio Otago operated the following stations:
 Fifeshire FM Nelson
 Fireshire Classic Nelson - Replaced with Solid Gold
 Easy Listening i94FM Christchurch - Rebranded as Lite FM in 1998, and in 2004 rebranded again as The Breeze (see below)
 C93FM
 Lite FM
 4XO Dunedin
 93Rox Dunedin - Rebranded as C93FM
 Mosgiel FM (Closed down in 1997)
 Radio Dunedin
 Radio Central, Central Otago
 Radio Wanaka
 Resort Radio Queenstown
 Big River Radio Balclutha - rebranded as a fully networked More FM station in 2018
 Foveaux FM Southland

Today Radio Dunedin and Radio Wanaka are the only stations still operating under their heritage name. Radio Wanaka was sold to a different operator. 4XO, Fifeshire FM, Radio Central, Resort Radio and Foveaux FM were all rebranded as More FM in late 2004/early 2005 after RadioWorks rebranded most of their heritage stations as More FM. Fifeshire Classic was closed down by RadioWorks in 1999 and replaced with Solid Gold.

Easy Listening i94FM was a franchised station and after this franchise agreement ended the station was rebranded as Lite FM, prior to this Lite FM had been based from Dunedin and networked to Invercargill. Lite FM in Dunedin and Invercargill were replaced with Solid Gold following the merger of Radio Otago and RadioWorks. Lite FM remained in Christchurch and was rebranded as The Breeze in 2004 after RadioWorks rebranded all their Easy Listening stations as The Breeze.

93Rox in Dunedin was rebranded as C93FM originally separate from the Christchurch station and networked to Invercargill as C91FM. C93FM was later networked from Christchurch with the Southland station now branded as C93FM despite broadcasting on 90.8FM. Following the merger, C93FM in Dunedin and Invercargill was replaced with network station The Rock, C93FM continued to broadcast in Christchurch but now with a change of format to Adult Contemporary and The Rock launched in Christchurch on a separate frequency. The change of format for C93 was not popular and the station was shut down in 2001 and replaced with Solid Gold.

References 

Radio stations in Dunedin
Radio stations established in 1971
Radio stations disestablished in 1999
Radio broadcasting companies of New Zealand